This is a list of Adena culture sites. The Adena culture was a Pre-Columbian Native American culture that existed from 1000 to 200 BCE, in a time known as the early Woodland Period. The Adena culture refers to what were probably a number of related Native American societies sharing a burial complex and ceremonial system. The Adena lived in a variety of locations, including: Ohio, Indiana, West Virginia, Kentucky, and parts of Pennsylvania and New York.

See also
 Adena culture
 Hopewell tradition
 Fort Ancient culture

References

External links

Adena culture
Archaeological cultures of North America
Archaeology of the United States